Cralopa is a genus of small air-breathing land snails, terrestrial pulmonate gastropod mollusks in the family Charopidae.

Species
Species within the genus Cralopa include:
 Cralopa carlessi Cralopa colliveri Cralopa kaputarensis Cralopa stroudensis'' – the type species

References

 Catalogue of life info here: 
 Authority and date, etc, here: 

 
Charopidae
Taxonomy articles created by Polbot